Red peach cake, also known as rice peach cake and rice cake is a small teardrop shaped Teochew kuih (stuffed dumpling) with soft sticky glutinous rice flour skin wrapped over a filling of glutinous rice, peanuts, mushrooms, and shallots. The skin of the kuih is often dyed pink, and shaped with a wooden mould before steaming. The cake is native to the Teochew people.

References 

Kue
Steamed foods
Teochew cuisine
Singaporean cuisine
Malaysian snack foods